Muhammad Harith bin Kanadi (born 1 August 2000) is a Singaporean footballer currently playing as a left back for Geylang International.

Club career

Geylang International
Harith signed for Geylang International in 2019 for the 2019 season.

International career
Harith was invited for the national team training on 3 and 10 March 2020. This was his first involvement with the senior side.

Career statistics

Club

Notes

International

U23 International caps

References

2000 births
Living people
Singaporean footballers
Association football midfielders
Singapore Premier League players
Tampines Rovers FC players
Geylang International FC players
Competitors at the 2021 Southeast Asian Games
Southeast Asian Games competitors for Singapore